Rudolfiella aurantiaca is a species of orchid occurring from Trinidad to tropical South America. It is the type species of the genus Rudolfiella.

References

External links 

aurantiaca
Orchids of Trinidad